The 1949–50 Tercera División was the 14th edition of the Spanish third national tier.

Format 
90 clubs in 5 geographic groups of 18 participated this season.  The group winners and runners up (10 clubs) progressed to the Final Phase.  These 10 clubs were joined by Las Palmas and Tenerife who were not officially members of the Tercera División. Two groups of 6 were formed with clubs playing home and away (10 matches).  The winners and runners up of each group (4 clubs) were promoted to the Segunda División.  The third and fourth placed teams participated in promotion/relegation play-offs against the teams finishing 14th and 15th in the North and South groups of the Segunda División.

Regular season

Group 1

Group 2

Group 3

Group 4

Group 5

Final phase

Group I

Group II

Promotion/relegation play-off

Replay:

Continuing in Segunda: C.F. Badalona & Cartagena C.F.
Promotion to Segunda: C.D. San Andrés & S.D. Ceuta
Relegation to Tercera: Club Erandio & Elche C.F.

Relegation Phase

Promoción Permanencia en Tercera - Grupo I 

Vimenor retired in this group.

Promoción Permanencia en Tercera - Grupo II

Promoción Permanencia en Tercera - Grupo III

Promoción Permanencia en Tercera - Grupo IV 

Gim. Abad, gave up taking part in competition.

Promoción Permanencia en Tercera - Grupo V

Fase de Permanencia en Tercera 

Berbés participating in Permanency phase.
Sueca and Electromecánicas,  gave up taking part in competition.

Notes

External links
 Official LFP Site
Research by Asociación para la Recopilación de Estadísticas del Fútbol (AREFE)

Tercera División seasons
3
Spain